The M915 is a tractor unit used for line haul missions by the United States Army. Designed for use on improved roads it does not have a driven front axle.

History 
The M915 is the namesake and basis of a tactical truck series, although it is not tactical itself. It is a commercial type conventional 6x4 rear wheel drive 14-ton semi-tractor designed for use on improved roads. A powered front axle and other tactical equipment are not needed for this role, allowing a lighter and simpler truck. It shares the engine, transmission, cab, and some components of the other trucks in the series. 

The more specialized trucks in the series are the M916 6x6 all wheel drive 14-Ton Light Equipment Transporter (LET) tractor with rear winch; M917 8x6 20-ton, 12 cubic yard Dump Truck; M918 6x6 22.5-ton, 1,500 gallon Bituminous Distributor; M919 8x6 22.5-ton, 8 cubic yard Concrete Mixer; and M920 8x6 20-ton Medium Equipment Transporter (MET) tractor with rear winch, all of which are employed in Engineer Combat Support and Construction units.

The M915 and follow on M915A1 were a Crane Carrier Company design based on CCC's Centaur commercial tractor, built under contract by AM General between 1978 and 1982. The 1990 -A2 upgrade was a completely different truck: a Freightliner Trucks design with a different engine and transmission, hood and cab. Older models were upgraded to -A4 standard with a new cab and frame that used the original truck's components. Starting in 2009 M915A3s were upgraded to the armored -A5 standard.

Engine and driveline 
Both are turbocharged inline 6 cylinder 4-stroke diesel engine, both engines are intercooled. The Cummins uses a water to air after-cooler while the Series 60 uses an air to air after-cooler.

The M915 has a Caterpillar 16 speed semi-automatic transmission, the M915A2 Allison HT-470 4-speed automatic.

Chassis 
A conventional ladder frame has a front steering axle with a  weight rating and tandem rear axles with a  weight rating.

A Holland commercial type sliding fifth wheel could carry . It towed the M871 -ton (20,400 kg) 2 axle flatbed, the M872 34-ton (30,800 kg) 3 axle flatbed, and the M1067.

Gallery

References

External links 

 M915 Technical Manuals M915 Technical Library
 M915 Line-Haul Tractor - Olive-Drab

Military trucks of the United States
Military vehicles introduced in the 1970s